The Ministry of Health, Population and Hospital Reform  (MSPRH) is the health ministry of Republic of Algeria.  It is located in El Madania, a municipality of Algiers.  The Ministry is responsible for public health facilities and population monitoring.  The Minister is a member of the Council of Ministers of Algeria, which reports to the President of Algeria as part of the executive branch of the government.

History
The Ministry of Health, Population and Hospital Reform was formerly the Ministry of Health and Population.  The name was changed in about 2000.

The ministry has organized the country into five regions with 5 Health Regional Councils (CRS) and 5 Regional Health Observatories (RHAs). At the Provincial level, there are 48 Directorates of Health and Population (one per province).

Ministers
The current minister is Abdelhak Saihi (since 9 September 2022). Former ministers include: 
:fr:Abderrahmane Benbouzid (January 4, 2020September 8, 2022)
Mohamed Miraoui (20192020)
Mokhtar Hasbellaoui (20172019)
:fr:Abdelmalek Boudiaf (20132017)
:fr:Abdelaziz Ziari (20122013)
:fr:Said Barkat, Minister of Health (20082010)
:fr:Amor Tou (20052008)
Yahia Kaidum (1995)
 (19921994)
Zahia Mentouri, Minister of Health and Social Affairs (1992)
:fr:Nafissa Hamoud, Minister of Health (early 1990s)
:fr:Amara Benyounes, administrator of the Ministry of Health (19881990)
Kasdi Merbah, Minister of Health (1988)
:fr:Mohamed Seghir Nekkache, Minister of Health (19621965)

Organization
The Ministry is organized into the following units:

Public health establishments
In 2020, there were according to the Ministry 586 public health establishments in Algeria.  There are 69,948 beds in CHU, EHU, EH, EHS, and EPH establishments and 6,584 beds in community hospitals (EPSP).  These establishments are broken down as follows:

Centre Hospitalo-Universitaire (CHU)

According to the Algerian Ministry of Health, Population and Hospital Reform there were 15 Centre Hospitalo-Universitaire (CHU) in Algeria in 2019, up from 13 in 2004.  In 2019, there were 13,755 beds in the CHU facilities. A CHU may include multiple hospitals. Below is a list of the CHU in Algeria, showing the region, city, province, affiliated university, and number of beds.

References

External links
  
  

Algeria
Health, Population and Hospital Modernization
Hospitals in Algeria